Gare de Valence TGV (IATA: XHK) is a railway station in Valence, France which offers regular TGV services. The station, located in eastern Valence (Alixan), is about ten kilometres north-east from the town centre, allowing through trains to pass at full speed. With its opening in 2001, the station has considerably shortened travel times for travellers throughout eastern France.

Valence TGV was built for and opened along with the LGV Méditerranée, which extends south from Valence to Marseille.  The station is only 1 km south of the end of LGV Rhône-Alpes, which extends north from Valence to Lyon and, via the LGV Sud-Est, on to Paris in 2h11.

Station
Valence TGV has some unique station architecture. Built primarily of reinforced concrete, one of the main features is the glass on all walls of the station building. The station is built on a slight incline, which makes it slightly harder for handicapped people to move around the building.

Valence TGV is a bi-level station, the top level is used for TER trains while the bottom level is used for TGV trains.  The lower level, aligned roughly north-south, has 4 tracks: 2 in the centre allow through trains to pass without slowing, and 2 outer tracks are used for stopping TGV services. The upper level, aligned north-east to south-west, has 2 platforms for trains on the Valence–Moirans railway, a classic line which runs southwest to Valence city, and northeast to Moirans and Grenoble. There are regular shuttles from Valence TGV to Valence City station, in the city centre.

French highway RD 532 provides road access to the station, and two large carparks have been built at the station to allow passengers to park their car and ride the train.

Train services
The station is served by the following services:

High speed services (TGV) Brussels Midi/Zuid - Paris-Charles de Gaulle Airport TGV - Lyon - Valence TGV - Avignon TGV - Marseille
High speed services (TGV) Lille - TGV Haute-Picardie - Paris-Charles de Gaulle Airport TGV - Lyon - Valence TGV - Avignon TGV - Marseille
High speed services (TGV) Brussels Midi/Zuid - Paris-Charles de Gaulle Airport TGV - Lyon - Valence TGV - Nîmes - Montpellier (- Béziers - Perpignan)
High speed services (TGV) Lille Europe - TGV Haute-Picardie - Paris-Charles de Gaulle Airport TGV - Lyon - Valence TGV - Nîmes - Montpellier
High speed services (TGV) Paris-Gare de Lyon - Valence TGV - Nîmes - Montpellier (- Béziers)
High speed services (TGV) Paris-Gare de Lyon - Valence TGV - Nîmes - Montpellier - Perpignan - Barcelona
High speed services (TGV) Lyon - Nîmes - Montpellier - Perpignan - Barcelona
High speed services (TGV) Lyon - Valence TGV - Aix-en-Provence TGV - Marseille - Nice
High speed services (TGV) Lyon - Nîmes - Montpellier - Toulouse
High speed services (TGV) Metz/Strasbourg - Dijon - Lyon - Nîmes - Montpellier/Marseille
High speed services (TGV) Luxembourg - Metz - Strasbourg - Mulhouse - Besançon - Dijon - Lyon - Valence TGV - Avignon TGV - Marseille/Montpellier
High speed services (TGV) Rennes - Le Mans - Lyon - Valence TGV - Avignon TGV - Marseille
High speed services (TGV) Le Havre - Rouen - Lyon - Valence TGV - Avignon TGV - Marseille
High speed services (TGV) Rennes - Le Mans - Lyon - Valence TGV - Nîmes - Montpellier
High speed services (TGV) Nantes - Angers - Le Mans - Lyon - Valence TGV - Nîmes - Montpellier
High speed service (Thalys) Amsterdam - Brussels Midi/Zuid - Paris-Charles de Gaulle Airport TGV - Valence TGV - Avignon TGV - Marseille (Summer Saturdays only)
High speed services (Ouigo) Tourcoing - Paris-Charles de Gaulle Airport TGV - Lyon - Valence TGV - Nîmes-Pont-du-Gard - Montpellier Sud de France
High speed services (Ouigo) Paris-Gare de Lyon - Valence TGV - Nîmes - Montpellier
Local services (TER Auvergne-Rhône-Alpes) Valence - Grenoble
Local services (TER Auvergne-Rhône-Alpes) Valence - Grenoble - Chambéry - Aix-les-Bains - Annecy/Geneve

A limited number of services operate via Lyon Saint-Exupéry Airport rather than Lyon-Part-Dieu.

Travel Times
Travel times have been decreased dramatically using Valence TGV station.

Direct TGV services from Valence TGV, best travel time (frequencies)

 Aéroport Charles de Gaulle 2 – TGV, 2h29 to 2h46 (7 per day)
 Aix en Provence TGV, 0h47 to 1h00 (4 per day)
 Amsterdam Centraal Thalys summer service every Saturday from end of June to end of August.
 Bordeaux, 6h01 to 6h27 (5 per day, change at Montpellier)
 Bruxelles, 4h06 to 4h41 (4 per day)
 Dijon, 2h16 (2 to 4 per day)
 Genève-Cornavin, 2h27 (1 per day), 3h05 via direct TER service
 Le Creusot TGV, 1h28 (4 per week)
 Le Havre, 5h11 (1 per day)
 Lille-Europe, 3h35 to 3h51 (7 per day)
 Lyon Part-Dieu, 00h34
 Lyon Saint Exupéry, 00h25 (1 per day)
 Mantes-la-Jolie, 3h57 (1 per day)
 Marne la Vallée (Disneyland), 2h15 to 2h32 (7 per day)
 Marseille-Saint-Charles, 0h58 (12 per day)
 Massy TGV, 2h46 to 3h12 (3 per day)
 Montpellier, 1h09
 Nantes, 5h19 (1 per day)
 Nice, 3h49 (4 per day)
 Nîmes, 0h43
 Paris-Gare de Lyon, 2h15 (8 per day)
 Perpignan, 2h46 (4 per day)
 Rennes, 4h57 (2 per day)
 Rouen, 4h24 (1 per day)
 TGV Haute Picardie, 2h59 (3 per day)
 Toulouse, 3h23 (1 per day)
 Versailles-Chantiers, 3h05 (1 per day)

Bus Services
 Valence TGV - Valence
 Valence TGV - Valence - Le Pouzin - Privas - Aubenas
 Valence TGV - Romans-Bourg-de-Péage
 Valence TGV - Grenoble
 Valence TGV - Montelimar - Aubenas - Les Vans
 Valence TGV - Valence - Die - Gap - Briancon

References

External links

 
Réseau TER et cars Auvergne-Rhône-Alpes, TER Auvergne-Rhône-Alpes

Buildings and structures in Drôme
Railway stations in France opened in 2001
Railway stations in Auvergne-Rhône-Alpes